A series of financial allegations concerning corporate lawyer David Mills came under investigation in 2006 by Italian authorities, who suspected him of corruptly receiving £340,000 from Silvio Berlusconi in the 1990s. As he was married at the time to Tessa Jowell, the then United Kingdom Secretary of State for Culture, Media and Sport, some newspapers termed the accusations Jowellgate.

History 
Tessa Jowell married international corporate lawyer David Mills in 1979. In the early 1990s, Mills acted for Silvio Berlusconi, then a high-profile businessman and former Prime Minister of Italy. During his work for Berlusconi, Mills received $600,000 (£340,000); the precise source of the money and the reason for its payment was under dispute, with Mills saying that the money was part of a larger amount paid indirectly to him by another Italian client, Diego Attanasio, although Attanasio has denied this claim when found in London on 2 March (between custodial sentences for bribery and corruption).

Mills was investigated in Italy for money laundering and alleged tax fraud and on 10 March 2006 Italian prosecuting magistrates decided that they had sufficient evidence to ask a judge to indict Berlusconi and Mills.

The judgement was appealed by David Mills. On 27 October 2009, the Italian Appeal Court upheld his conviction and his sentence of 4½ years prison. He confirmed that he would initiate a second and final appeal to the Cassation Court.

On 25 February 2010, the Italian Cassation Court (the second and last court of appeal under Italian law) ruled a sentence of not guilty because the statute of limitations had expired.

Procedural changes
Sir Alistair Graham, Chairman of the Committee on Standards in Public Life (2003-7), said the controversy over Jowell highlighted the problem that public trust was being undermined by the way alleged misconduct by ministers was policed. He stated that he was "puzzled" by the Prime Minister's reluctance to change the rules; the Committee proposed that independent figures, rather than senior civil servants, should investigate claims that the ministerial code has been broken.

On 16 March 2006 Blair announced that a new independent figure would advise ministers on potential clashes between their public duties and private affairs and investigate potential breaches of the ministerial code of conduct. The Prime Minister would continue to have the final say on taking action.

References

Jowellgate
2006 in the United Kingdom